The 1996 United States presidential election in Iowa took place on November 5, 1996, as part of the 1996 United States presidential election. Voters chose seven representatives, or electors to the Electoral College, who voted for president and vice president.

Iowa was easily won by Democratic incumbent President Bill Clinton over Republican Senator Bob Dole of Kansas, with Clinton winning 50.26% of the vote to Dole's 39.92%, a margin of 10.34%. The Reform Party candidate, billionaire businessman Ross Perot, finished in third, with 8.52% of the popular vote. Although Clinton barely exceeded Michael Dukakis’ 1988 margin in Iowa, he was the first Democrat to carry Allamakee County and Butler County – the only Iowa counties outside the arch-conservative western fringe to back Barry Goldwater in 1964 – since Franklin D. Roosevelt in 1936. He was indeed only the second Democratic presidential nominee to ever carry Butler County since the Civil War.

Iowa was one of thirteen states where on the election ballot, James Campbell of California, Perot's former boss at IBM, was listed as a stand-in Vice-Presidential candidate.

, this is the last time Iowa was decided by a double-digit margin. It is also the last time that the counties of Adair, Appanoose, Butler, Calhoun, Cherokee, Clay, Dallas, Davis, Decatur, Dickinson, Guthrie, Hancock, Henry, Keokuk, Lucas, Madison, Monona, Monroe, Pocahontas, Ringgold, Taylor, Van Buren, Washington, Wayne, and Wright voted for the Democratic Party presidential nominee.

Results

Results by county

Counties that flipped from Republican to Democratic
13 counties that voted for the Republican nominee, George H. W. Bush, in 1992, supported Bill Clinton in 1996.

 Adair (largest city: Greenfield)
 Allamakee (largest city: Waukon)
 Butler (largest city: Parkersburg)
 Calhoun (largest city: Lake City)
 Cherokee (largest city: Cherokee)
 Delaware (largest city: Manchester)
 Dickinson (largest city: Spirit Lake)
 Franklin (largest city: Hampton)
 Hancock (largest city: Garner)
 Iowa (largest city: Williamsburg)
 Washington (largest city: Washington)
 Winnebago (largest city: Forest City)
 Woodbury (largest city: Sioux City)

See also
 United States presidential elections in Iowa

Notes

References

Iowa
1996
1996 Iowa elections